The Carol Tambor Best of Edinburgh Award is a theater prize given annually at the Edinburgh Festival Fringe.

History

The Award has presented by the Carol Tambor Theatrical Foundation since 2004.  In a formal agreement with the Fringe Society, it will be given in perpetuity.

Rules

All productions which receive a four or five star review in The Scotsman newspaper and have not previously been presented in New York City are eligible for the prize.

The winner is announced at The Scotsman's final Fringe First Award ceremony, which is held on the final Friday morning of the Festival Fringe.  The winner receives a four-week run at an Off-Broadway Theater in New York, all expenses paid, including: visa expenses; transportation for cast, crew and props; hotel for cast and crew; per diems; guaranteed stipend; and net box office receipts.

The run in New York coincides with the Association of Performing Arts Presenters convention each January for additional exposure and opportunity for transfers to other theaters.  The Foundation takes no commercial interest in the future of the production.

Prizewinners

The previous winners are:

 2004: Sisters, Such Devoted Sisters by Russell Barr; and Rosebud by Mark Jenkins
 2005: Absence and Presence by Andrew Dawson
 2006: Goodness by Michael Redhill
 2007: Between the Devil and the Deep Blue Sea by 1927
 2008: Eight by Ella Hickson
 2009: Little Gem by Elaine Murphy
 2010: Ovid's Metamorphoses, by Pants on Fire
 2011: Leo, by Circle of Eleven
 2012: Mies Julie by Yaël Farber; Midsummer by David Greig
 2013: The Events by David Greig
 2014: Object Lesson, by Geoff Sobelle
 2015: Key Change by Catrina McHugh
 2016: Life According to Saki by Katherine Rundell
2017: The Flying Lovers of Vitebsk by Kneehigh; Borders by Henry Naylor
2018: Ulster American by David Ireland
2019: Mouthpiece by Keiran Hurley  
Shortlisted: Big Bite-Size Breakfast Show by White Room Theatre; Burgerz by performance Travis Alabanza; Dispatches on the Red Dress by Rowan Rheingans, and Knot by Nikki Rummer and JD Broussé)

References

External links 
 Best of Edinburgh Award
 Edinburgh Festival Fringe
 NY Times
 Glasgow Herald

Edinburgh Festival
Scottish awards
British theatre awards
Annual events in Edinburgh
2004 establishments in Scotland
Awards established in 2004